The .222 Rimmed is a centrefire rifle cartridge, originating in Australia in the 1960s as a cartridge for single shot rifles, particularly the Martini Cadet action. Performance is similar to the .222 Remington on which it is based however loads should be reduced as the walls of the brass cases are generally thicker.
Extraction of cases that have been loaded to higher pressures can be difficult due to the inefficient extraction method utilised by the Martini Cadet.

Cases and loaded rounds were originally produced by the Super Cartridge Company. Brass is now available from the Bertram Bullet Company or can be made from 5.6x50mmR RWS cases.

The .222 Rimmed has also been used as a parent case for wildcats, similar to ones based on the .222 Remington, such as rimmed versions of the .17 Mach IV, the .17-222, and the .20 VarTarg.

Sorry would you please correct the measurements shown in this? - the case length as actually measured by me, is 1.69 to 1.70, not 1.85. Point of logic: 1.85 would make it longer than the .223!! All dimensions on the 222 rimmed are identical to the 222, I have measured it all, except that the rimmed brass has a noticeable rim, and no indentation at the base. I resize my 222 rimmed brass using a 222 die set and a 357 magnum die holder. It first the martini cadet perfectly, and the 357 shell holder holds the case in the same place as a 222 shellholder would hold a rimless 222 case. In summary, the data for this cartridge should be made to match the 222 remington except that there is a rim and no indent near the base (extraction groove). This article actually confused me before I had seen 222 rimmed bullets in real life. It made me think they were not so similar, but they really are. I would like it updated so that others are not confused as I was, and will know to go ahead and buy a 222 die set and number 1 (357 mag) shellholder.

See also

.222 Remington
Martini Cadet
List of rifle cartridges

References

Pistol and rifle cartridges
Rimmed cartridges